Bhagawati Khatri (born January 26, 1972) is a female Nepalese sport shooter. She placed 43rd in the women's 10 metre air rifle event at the 2000 Summer Olympics.

References

External links
 

1972 births
Living people
ISSF rifle shooters
Nepalese female sport shooters
Olympic shooters of Nepal
Shooters at the 2000 Summer Olympics